There are several other villages called Long Phước
Long Phước is a commune (xã) and village in Bà Rịa–Vũng Tàu province, Vietnam. When it was part of South Vietnam, it was in Phước Tuy province. 

The village was destroyed and forcibly resettled by Australian troops establishing an exclusion zone around the newly constructed Nui Dat base in the weeks leading up to the Battle of Long Tan on 18 August 1966. In that battle, a much smaller Australian unit recorded a decisive victory over the Vietnamese communist forces. The village was one of two destroyed as a Vietcong stronghold, standing on a maze of tunnels, one of which ran nearly 2 miles to Long Tan. However, the resettlement created great resentment and spread and displaced Viet Cong supporters. A minefield was laid, which and other use of landmines in Vietnam became a source of mines for the Viet Cong to use against those who laid them.

The tunnels at Luong Phuoc are now open, preserved as part of a museum.

References

External links
The Battle of Long Tan: News.com.au 40th Anniversary special
Vietnam - The Battle of Long Tan

Populated places in Bà Rịa-Vũng Tàu province
Communes of Bà Rịa-Vũng Tàu province